Russell Craig Eadie (January 10, 1948 – October 30, 1990), better known by his stage name Craig Russell, was a Canadian female impersonator and actor.

Early life and career
Born in Toronto, Russell became president of Mae West's fan club as a teenager, and he briefly worked and lived in Los Angeles as her secretary. He returned to Toronto where he moved in with the writer Margaret Gibson. He worked as a hairdresser while pursuing his career as a stage entertainer. By 1971, he was a regular performer in Toronto gay clubs and had a burgeoning international following. He toured Las Vegas, Hollywood, San Francisco, Berlin, London, Paris, Amsterdam, Hamburg and Sydney.

His celebrity impersonations included Carol Channing, Bette Davis, Mae West, Barbra Streisand, Tallulah Bankhead, Marlene Dietrich, Bette Midler, Anita Bryant, Shirley Bassey, Peggy Lee and Judy Garland.

In 1977, Russell starred in the film Outrageous!, based on a short story written by Gibson about their time as roommates. The film was entered into the 28th Berlin International Film Festival, where Russell won the Silver Bear for Best Actor, and Russell was a Canadian Film Award nominee for Best Actor in 1977.

A decade later, in 1987, he starred in a sequel to Outrageous!, titled Too Outrageous!. Russell also released an album titled "Glamour Monster" in 1987 with the help of his manager and publicity agent Gino Empry, and multiple producers, so profits could contribute funds to AIDS research.

Personal life and death
After struggling with the failure of several shows, mistakes, and mental health issues due to the commitment to the roles he played, Russell developed drug dependency and addiction issues involving cocaine, which eventually led to his downfall.

Russell fathered a daughter, Susan Allison ("Allison"), who was born January 6, 1973, in Toronto. Father and daughter developed a relationship in the years before his death. Although he publicly identified as gay rather than bisexual, Russell married his close friend Lori Jenkins in 1982. Before his marriage to close friend and fan Jenkins, he engaged in various serious relationships with both men and women.

Russell remained married to Lori until his death in 1990 of a stroke related to complications from AIDS. He was cremated and buried at Pine Grove Cemetery in Port Perry, Ontario.

His widow Lori died on August 15, 2008 at Toronto Grace Hospital after a long battle with cancer. Her body was buried beside her husband in Port Perry.

A play titled Margaret and Craig, written by David Solomon, based on the writing of both Russell and Gibson, was in development. The play was produced in workshop at Vassar College's Powerhouse Theater in Summer 2011 with Mario Cantone as Russell and Jeni Verdon as Gibson.

In 2020, Brian Bradley published the biography Outrageous Misifts: Female Impersonator Craig Russell and His Wife, Lori Russell Eadie.

Filmography

Film

Television

References

External links

Craig Russell Glbtq.com

1948 births
1990 deaths
Male actors from Toronto
AIDS-related deaths in Canada
Canadian male film actors
Canadian male television actors
Canadian gay actors
Silver Bear for Best Actor winners
20th-century Canadian male actors
Canadian drag queens
20th-century Canadian LGBT people